is a Japanese professional wrestler currently working as a freelancer and is best known for his time in the Japanese promotions Osaka Pro Wrestling and Dotonbori Pro Wrestling. A masked wrestler, Kuuga is  greatly influenced by lucha libre, and because of this, he has followed Mexican tradition for masked wrestlers, so his real name is not a matter of public record.

Professional wrestling career

Independent circuit (1995–present)
Kuuga made his professional wrestling debut at SPWF Fierce Fighting October Series, an event promoted by Social Pro Wrestling Federation on October 13, 1995, where he teamed up with Asian Condor in a losing effort to Masahiko Kochi and Toyonari Fujita as a result of a tag team match.

As a freelancer he is known for competing in various promotions. He participated in Pro Wrestling Noah's Differ Cup in the 2003 edition under the name Kappa Kozo where he teamed up with The Great Takeru representing IWA Japan, falling short to Kenta and Kotaro Suzuki in a first-round match. At JWP Climax 2005, an event promoted by JWP Joshi Puroresu on December 3, he teamed up with Baby-M and Baye-L in a losing effort to Command Bolshoi, Darkside Bolshoi and Darkside Hero as a result of a six-person tag team match. At OZ Mysterious Dance, an event produced by Oz Academy on September 17, 2007, he teamed up with Chikayo Nagashima in a losing effort to Sonoko Kato and Atsushi Kotoge. At FREEDOMS Daisuke Masaoka 10th Anniversary, an event promoted by Pro Wrestling Freedoms on October 19, 2014, he teamed up with Jun Kasai to defeat UNCHAIN (Kenji Fukimoto and Masashi Takeda). At Tenryu Project/VKF ~Survive~, an event promoted by Tenryu Project on December 2, 2014, he competed in a 24-man battle royal also involving Genichiro Tenryu, Kengo Mashimo, Mitsunobu Kikuzawa, Ryuichi Kawakami and others. At BJW BJ Style 12, an event promoted by Big Japan Pro Wrestling on March 25, 2017, Kuuga teamed up with Billy Ken Kid to defeat B Faultless Junky's (Jaki Numazawa and Masashi Takeda) for the WDW Tag Team Championship. At AJPW Zeus Festival 2017, an event promoted by All Japan Pro Wrestling on November 11, he teamed up with Gaina in a losing effort to Burning Wild (Jun Akiyama and Takao Omori).

DDT Pro-Wrestling (1997–2005)
Kuuga worked for DDT Pro-Wrestling under the name of Asian Cougar. He is known for competing in various of the promotion's signature events such as DDT Judgement, making his first appearance at the first-ever event under this branch, the Judgement 1997 from March 25 where he defeated Kyohei Mikami. His last appearance occurred at Judgement 6 on March 25, 2002, where he teamed up with Onryo to unsuccessfully challenge Mikami and Takashi Sasaki for the KO-D Tag Team Championship.

New Japan Pro Wrestling (2006–2010)
Kuuga wrestled in severaltour matches organized by New Japan Pro Wrestling. His first appearance occurred at NJPW Lock Up on July 29, 2006, where he teamed up with Gentaro to defeat Hirooki Goto and Minoru. At NJPW Circuit 2010 New Japan Brave on April 30, he teamed up with Ryusuke Taguchi to defeat Akira Nogami and Tiger Mask.

Osaka Pro Wrestling (2003–2013)
Kuuga is probably best known for his time in Osaka Pro Wrestling. He participated in one of the promotion's signature events, the Osaka Hurricane making his first appearance at the 2007 edition of the event from February 12 where he fell short to Super Dolphin. At the 2008 edition of the event, he teamed up with The Great Sasuke to defeat Tigers Mask and Black Buffalo for the Osaka Tag Team Championship.

Championships and accomplishments
DDT Pro-Wrestling
Ironman Heavymetalweight Championship (2 times)
Dotonbori Pro Wrestling
WDW Championship (1 time)
WDW Tag Team Championship (1 time) – with Billy Ken Kid
Doutonbori Saikyo Tag King Kettei Tournament (2015) – with Magnitude Kishiwada
Elite Canadian Championship Wrestling
ECCW Pacific Cup (2000)International Wrestling Association JapanIWA World Junior Heavyweight Championship (1 time)National Wrestling AllianceNWA Canadian Junior Heavyweight Championship (1 time)Osaka Pro WrestlingOsaka Openweight Championship (1 time)
Osaka Tag Team Championship (4 times) – with Tsubasa (1), The Great Sasuke (1), Orochi (1) and Hayata (1)
MWF World Junior Heavyweight Championship (1 time)
OPW Tennozan (2015)Tenryu ProjectInternational Junior Heavyweight Tag Team Championship (1 time) – with GamerasuThrash Wrestling'''
Thrash Wrestling Championship (1 time)

References 

Living people
Japanese male professional wrestlers
People from Wakayama Prefecture
Unidentified wrestlers
Year of birth missing (living people)
20th-century professional wrestlers
21st-century professional wrestlers
Ironman Heavymetalweight Champions
International Junior Heavyweight Tag Team Champions